Dutch FilmWorks B.V. is a Dutch film distributor founded in 1998, based in Utrecht, the Netherlands, focusing on Benelux rights mainly to release films theatrically, on DVD, Blu-ray and VOD. They are also a publisher and distributor of books and magazines.

They have recently released several TV series in the CBS library on DVD, under license from CBS Home Entertainment and Paramount Pictures.

In 2022, StudioCanal acquired a majority stake in Dutch FilmWorks.

Background 
Dutch Filmworks purchases film licenses and releases these in the Benelux, and has a distribution library of over 2,500 titles. Large titles distributed by Dutch FilmWorks include Exorcist: The Prequel, The Grudge, The Aviator, Unleashed, Mr. Magorium's Wonder Emporium, The Final Cut and Saw, as well as Dutch products such as the television series Westenwind and the film 06/05.

'The House of Knowledge' is a separate branch of the business that distributes documentaries, including those from Discovery Channel.

In June 2022, French company StudioCanal acquired a majority stake in Dutch FilmWorks, adding the company to StudioCanal's vast belt of successful television and film companies in Europe. Dutch FilmWorks will focus on both movies and television, with its management and operations unchanged. StudioCanal's first collaboration with Dutch FilmWorks is an adaptation of the Magical Pharmacy book series, co-produced by Dutch FilmWorks and StudioCanal's German arm.

Filmography 
 Reasonable Doubt (2014)

References

External links 
 Official site
 Dutch Filmworks at the Internet Movie Database

Dutch film producers